Ntara is a settlement in Kitagwenda District, in Western Uganda. It is the political, administrative and commercial headquarters of the district. Ntara is one of the two municipalities in the newly-created Kitagwenda District, the other being Kabujogera Town Council.

Location
The geographical coordinates of Ntara are:0°00'17.0"N,  30°21'58.0"E (Latitude:0.004722; Longitude:30.366111).

Overview
The town of Ntara, is the largest urban centre in Kitagwenda District, and it serves as the district headquarters.

Landmarks
The landmarks at or near Ntara include:

 Mpanga Power Station - An 18 MW hydroelectric power plant across River Mpanga
 Lake George - An inland crater lake that lies entirely in Uganda within Queen Elizabeth National Park
 Mpanga Forest - A National Forest Reserve
 Queen Elizabeth National Park (QENP) - Lying within neighboring Kasese District and Rubirizi District, QENP is the most visited national park in Uganda
 Ntusi
 Munsa
 Bigo bya Mugenyi
 Rwenzori mountains National park
 Virunga National park
 Kyambura Game Reserve
 Kibale forest corridor game reserve
 Kibale National game park
 Lake Mburo National park
 Semuliki wildlife reserve
 Semuliki National park
 Kigezi game reserve
 Bwindi impenetrable forest National park
 Mgahinga Gorilla National Park
 Ibanda game reserve
 Katonga game reserve
 Matiri central game reserve.

Ethnicities
The predominant ethnic group in Ntara are Batagwenda who speak Rutagwenda, followed by Batoro who speak Rutoro, Banyoro who speak Runyoro and Banyankore who speak Runyankore basically the indigenous Banyakitara.

Points of interest
These are some of the points of interest in or near Ntara:
 Ntara Town Council
 Ntara central market
 Kitagwenda District Administration headquarters
 Fort Ntara Uganda
 Kitagwenda High School
 Ntara Church of Uganda
 Ntara Roman Catholic Church 
 Ntara Seventh Day Adventist
 Kabujogera Evangelical church 
 Ntara Full Gospel Church 
 Pentecostal Assemblies of God
 Ntara Christian Primary School 
 St. Luke Orthodox Church
 Kicwamba mosque
 Ntara Health center II
 Ntara Health center IV
 Mpanga Power Station

See also
 Empire of kitara
 Toro sub-region
 Kitagwenda District
 Western Region, Uganda

References

External links
Kamwenge LCV Chairman Calls For Cohesion AS District Split Nears Fruition As of 22 January 2019.
 Kamwenge Finally Lets Go of New Kitagwenda District As of 29 June 2019.

Populated places in Western Region, Uganda
Cities in the Great Rift Valley
Kitagwenda District
Toro sub-region